Nandan is a government-sponsored film and cultural centre in Kolkata, India. The primary aim of the cultural hub is to encourage and facilitate cinematic awareness in society. It includes a few comparatively large screens housed in an impressively architectured building. The complex, besides being a modern cinema and cultural complex, is a popular destination for the young and the aged alike.

Nandan is one of the main venues of the Kolkata International Film Festival, hosting it until 2010.
While in 2011 the opening and closing ceremonies was shifted to Netaji Indoor Stadium, Nandan remains the main centre for the festival.

History 
The foundation stone of Nandan was laid by former Chief Minister of West Bengal Jyoti Basu in 1980 and it was inaugurated by film-maker Satyajit Ray on 2 September 1985. He designed the now-famous logo for the complex as well. Initially, Nandan had two auditoriums, a third auditorium was made soon after.

In April 2011, the false ceiling of a Nandan auditorium crashed down. Right after the incident, the West Bengal government decided to refurbish Nandan, starting the renovation work with the construction of a new false ceiling for Nandan I. For the first phase of the renovation project, West Government gave  to the Nandan authorities. The restoration works completed weeks before the 2011 Kolkata International Film Festival.

 The Nandan committee is headed by Bengali film director Sandip Ray. Few other members of the managing committee are Aparna Sen, Prabhat Roy, Ranjit Mallick etc.

Nandan and Buddhadeb Bhattacharjee 

Former Chief Minister of West Bengal Buddhadeb Bhattacharjee had a long relation with Nandan. In 1980 he laid the foundation stone of the theatre. After losing the 1982 assembly election from Cossipore, he did not come to Nandan until 1987, when he changed constituency to Jadavpur and after winning the election.

After becoming the Chief Minister of West Bengal in 2001, he started visiting the auditorium more frequently. Till 1995 he did not have own room here. Then he got a 300 sqft carpeted room on Nandan's second floor. Here he often used to meet personalities like Sunil Gangopadhyay, Soumitra Chatterjee etc. and proofread his writings on Manik Bandopadhyay or Jibanananda Das.
 
After being defeated at the 2011 assembly elections of West Bengal by the Trinamool congress candidate Manish Gupta, Bhattacharjee stopped coming here. According to a report published in The Telegraph in July 2011, two months after West Bengal's assembly elections, Bhattacharjee almost stopped visiting his favourite evening spot.

Arrest of artists during 2007 Kolkata International Film Festival 
On 11 November 2007 afternoon, actors, artists and writers of West Bengal were demonstrating at a protest in Cathedral Road against Nandigram violence in which at least 14 people died. At the same time, the Kolkata International Film Festival was going on in the theatres on Nandan. Kolkata Police and Rapid Action Force personnel were sent to the spot who arrested nearly 100 protesters including 20 women. The list of people who were arrested on the day included actor Parambrata Chatterjee, actress Bidipta Chakraborty etc. They were released after five hours after a meeting between deputy commissioner (headquarters) Vineet Goyel and a group of protesters led by director Aparna Sen, Gautam Ghose and Bengali poet Sankha Ghosh. Later, actor Parambrata Chatterjee told that he could not figure out the reason of the arrest— "I don’t know on what grounds we were arrested. We did not step into Nandan, nor did we have any arms and ammunition. We were sitting outside the Academy of Fine Arts, singing."

Programs and festivals 

Nandan has been a cultural hub of Kolkata for a long time. Memorial lectures and special programs are organised here on regular basis. Nandan also organises a Social Communication Film Festival in collaboration with Roopkala Kendra.

Kolkata International Film Festival 

Kolkata International Film Festival started in 1995 and is India's third oldest film festival. Nandan is one of the main venues of this festival. Till 2010 the film festival used to be inaugurated at Nandan. In 2011, Mamata Banerjee, after becoming the Chief Minister of West Bengal, shifted the ceremony from Nandan to the Netaji Indoor Stadium.

Little Magazine Festival 
A little magazine festival is organised by Paschimbanga Bangla Akademi in the Nandan premises every year. The festival commenced in 2001. Little magazine publishers from outside India (like Bangladesh) have also joined this festival.

Controversies 
There have been complaints against Nandan that screening of controversial films are often shunned here on political pressure. In 2005 Nandan committee disallowed screening of Herbert commenting the film would send out wrong signals to audiences. One Day from a Hangman's Life directed by Joshy Joseph was banned here after getting instruction from the Chief Minister of West Bengal. Arekti Premer Golpo (2010), directed by Kaushik Ganguly, which dealt with homosexuality, was also barred at this theatre. Moinak Biswas, associate professor at Jadavpur University, whose film Sthaniyo Sangbad was disallowed in Nandan in 2010 commented— "Since all these films, including mine, had a censor certificate, it wasn’t Nandan's role to play super censor." In May 2013, the theatre refused to screen the Bengali film Kagojer Nouka directed by Partha Sarathi Jowardar. The film revolved around a chit fund scam. Jowardar told to media that they sent the movie to Nandan authority for preview but he thought he did not even see the film before barring it.

See also 
 Priya Cinema (Kolkata)

References

External links

 of the Kolkata International Film Festival
Nandan (Kolkata) – BookMyShow

Tourist attractions in Kolkata
Culture of Kolkata
Buildings and structures in Kolkata
Cinemas in Kolkata
Arts centres in India
1985 establishments in West Bengal